The Sanna is a river of Tyrol, Austria, a tributary of the Inn.

The Sanna is formed near Tobadill by the confluence of the rivers

(from Arlberg and the valley )
and

(from Silvretta and Paznaun). It flows into the Inn at the small town of Landeck.
The villages Pians and Grins are situated at its waterfront.

The whitewater river is used for kayaking and was the site of the 1996 world championships.

References

External links
Kayaking infos

Rivers of Tyrol (state)
Lechtal Alps
Rivers of Austria